is a football stadium in Narashino, Chiba, Japan.

It was formerly known as Akitsu Park Soccer Stadium. Since April 2015 it has been called Frontier Soccer Field for the naming rights.

External links
Official site

Narashino
Sports venues in Chiba Prefecture
Football venues in Japan
JEF United Chiba
Sports venues completed in 1982
1982 establishments in Japan